Manfred Müller (15 November 1926 – 20 May 2015) was a German Catholic bishop.

Born in Augsburg, Germany, Müller was ordained to the priesthood in 1952 and was appointed titular bishop of Iubaltiana and auxiliary bishop of the Roman Catholic Diocese of Augsburg in 1972. In 1982, he was appointed bishop of the Roman Catholic Diocese of Regensburg and retired in 2002. On 20 May 2015, he died in the Mallersdorf Abbey in Bavaria.

References

Roman Catholic bishops of Regensburg
20th-century German Roman Catholic bishops
1926 births
2015 deaths
20th-century German Roman Catholic priests